Avenue U station may refer to:
 Avenue U (BMT Brighton Line), a local station on the BMT Brighton Line
 Avenue U (BMT Sea Beach Line), a local station on the BMT Sea Beach Line
 Avenue U (IND Culver Line), a local station on the IND Culver Line